The Ball State Cardinals baseball team is a varsity intercollegiate athletic team of Ball State University in Muncie, Indiana, United States. The team is a member of the Mid-American Conference West division, which is part of the National Collegiate Athletic Association's Division I. Ball State's first baseball team was fielded in 1920. The team plays its home games at Ball Diamond in Muncie, Indiana. The Cardinals are coached by Rich Maloney.

Awards
, Ball State has had eight players named the MAC Baseball Player of the Year, the most of any school in the conference.

See also
List of NCAA Division I baseball programs

References

External links
 

 
Baseball teams established in 1920